Salvati is a surname.

People from the surname 

 Jim Salvati (born 1957), American painter 
 Joe Salvati, American wrongfully convicted of murder
 Marc Salvati (born 1983), English former professional footballer
 Paolo Salvati (1939–2014), Italian painter
 Sergio Salvati (born 1938), Italian cinematographer
 Simone Salvati (born 1973), Italian snowboarder
 Mahmoud Salavati, Iranian cleric

See also 

 Favartia salvati
 Joculator salvati
 Lobophytum salvati
 Qaleh-ye Salvati, Iranian village

Surnames
Surnames of Italian origin